Kaká Werá Jecupé (born February 1, 1964, São Paulo) is a Brazilian Kayapo writer and politician. He is a member of the Green Party.

Works
 "Tupã Tenondé no pé"
 "A Terra dos Mil Povos - História Indígena do Brasil Contada por um Índio"
 "As Fabulosas Fábulas de Iauaretê"
 "Oré Awé - Todas as Vezes que Dissemos Adeus".

References

1964 births
Living people
Brazilian male writers
Green Party (Brazil) politicians
Kayapo people
Brazilian politicians of indigenous peoples descent